Simona Quadarella (born 18 December 1998) is an Italian swimmer. She specializes in long distance freestyle events. At the 2020 Summer Olympics, she won a bronze medal in Women's 800 metre freestyle, and at the 2019 World Championships in Gwangju, won the gold medal in the 1500 m freestyle, and the silver medal in the 800 m freestyle.

Career
Quadarella competed in the women's 1500 metre freestyle event at the 2017 World Aquatics Championships, winning the bronze medal. After her international explosion, which took place in 2017 at the age of 19, Simona Quadarella won 9 international medals in the two-year period 2017-2018 (7 gold and 2 bronze), including a trio of gold medals at the 2018 European Aquatics Championships in 400 m, 800 m and 1500 m freestyle. 
Than in July 2019, Quadarella won her first world title at the World Championships in Gwangju, taking gold in the 1500 m in a time of 15:40.89. She also won a silver medal in the 800 m race in a time of 8:14.99.

At the European Championships in Budapest 2020, held in May 2021 due to the COVID-19 pandemic, Quadarella won three gold medals (400 m, 800 m, 1500 m freestyle - the same feat achieved three years earlier in Glasgow 2018) and a bronze medal in the 4x200m freestyle. In July 2021, at the 2020 Summer Olympics, which were also postponed to 2021 due to the pandemic, she won the bronze medal in the 800 metre freestyle with a time of 8:18.35.

For the 1500 metre freestyle at the 2022 World Aquatics Championships, Quadarella placed fifth with a time of 16:03.84, finishing over 14 seconds behind bronze medalist Lani Pallister of Australia. She followed her performance up with a bronze medal-winning time of 8:19.00 in the 800 metre freestyle four days later.

2022 European Championships
At the 2022 European Aquatics Championships, held two months later in Rome, Quadarella won the gold medal in the 800 metre freestyle with a time of 8:20.54. The title was her third-consecutive in the 800 metre freestyle at LEN European Aquatics Championships and was the first time a female swimmer achieved the title in the event three times in a row. Three days later, she won the gold medal in the 1500 metre freestyle with a time of 15:54.15. The win marked her third-consecutive gold medal in the event at LEN European Aquatics Championships. Her medal also brought her total number of gold medals won at LEN European Aquatics Championships to eight, setting a new record for the most gold medals won by a female Italian swimmer over the course of their career at the Championships. The final day, she won the silver medal in the 400 metre freestyle, finishing behind gold medalist Isabel Marie Gose of Germany with a time of 4:04.77.

National records
 800 m freestyle: 8:14.99 Gwangju, 27 July 2019 - current holder
 1500 m freestyle: 15:40.89 Gwangju, 23 July 2019 - current holder

International medals
Individual

See also
 Italy national swimming team – Women multiple medalists
 List of Italian records in swimming

References

External links

Simona Quadarella profile at FIN web site 

1998 births
Living people
Italian female freestyle swimmers
Swimmers at the 2014 Summer Youth Olympics
Swimmers at the 2020 Summer Olympics
World Aquatics Championships medalists in swimming
Universiade medalists in swimming
European Aquatics Championships medalists in swimming
European Championships (multi-sport event) gold medalists
Mediterranean Games gold medalists for Italy
Mediterranean Games medalists in swimming
Swimmers at the 2018 Mediterranean Games
Universiade gold medalists for Italy
Youth Olympic gold medalists for Italy
Swimmers from Rome
Athletes of Fiamme Rosse
Medalists at the 2017 Summer Universiade
Olympic swimmers of Italy
Medalists at the 2020 Summer Olympics
Olympic bronze medalists in swimming
Olympic bronze medalists for Italy
Medalists at the FINA World Swimming Championships (25 m)
21st-century Italian women